Sultan Ahmad Shah ibni Almarhum Sultan Mahmud Shah (died 1513) was the last Sultan of the Malacca Sultanate.

The son of Sultan Mahmud Shah,  Ahmad Shah's rule began in 1511 when his father stepped aside, and ended in 1513 when he died during the kingdom's war with Portugal: His father stabbed him after failing to conquer Malacca. He was succeeded by his father.

Sultan Ahmad Shah was also involved in the myth of the Mount Ledang princess, where the princess had requested from the Sultan of Malacca, among other things, a bowl of the sultan's young son's, and hence Ahmad's blood in order to marry her.

There is also another account regarding how Ahmad Shah was in charge despite not being officially appointed as ruler to cover up for his father's escape with Tun Teja alongside Hang Tuah to the Indian Ocean.

External links 
 Kingdom of Malacca ( 2009-10-31) from MSN Encarta
 https://web.archive.org/web/20150706142851/http://www.malaccaguide.com/history_of_malacca_2.html

See also 
 Sultanate of Malacca
 Malay Annals

Sultans of Malacca
1513 deaths
16th-century murdered monarchs
Year of birth unknown
16th-century monarchs in Asia
Murder in 1513